Roriz is an urban parish located 10 km northeast of the city of Santo Tirso. It is a major industrial center. The population in 2011 was 3,665, in an area of 6.17 km². It is known by its Singeverga Monastery of the Benedictine order, famous for its Singeverga Liqueur, it also has a nuns convent St Scholastica famous for its butter cookies.

References

Freguesias of Santo Tirso